The Supreme Audit Office of the Czech Republicalternately known in English as the Supreme Control Office of the Czech Republicis a "unique, independent constitutional entity to supervise the management of the state property and the state budget."

It was a part of the original form of the Constitution of the Czech Republic, created by Article 97 of that document on 1 January 1993. However, because the constitution left all of the details of the operation of the office up to future legislation, it was not until Act 166/1993 came into effect on 1 July 1993 that the office could in practice be formed.

English name

The presence of two English names for the office is the result of varying translations of its name in the Constitution and its authorizing legislation. In the official translation of the Constitution, the name follows the Czech literally. Hence, it confers the name, "Supreme Control Office", indicating that the office performed the duties of a controller. In the official translation of Act 166/1993, however, a more precise English word is used, resulting in "Supreme Audit Office", conveying the sense that the principal duties of the office are those of an external auditor. It is this latter translation which has perhaps gained dominance, given its singular use on the agency's official website.

Some generally similar positions in governments worldwide include:
 Auditor General of Pakistan
 Comptroller General of the United States
 Supreme Chamber of Control of the Republic of Poland
 State Auditor of Mississippi
 Japanese Board of Audit
 Comptroller and Auditor General
 State Comptroller of Israel

References

External links
International Organization of Supreme Audit Institutions – Supreme Audit Office of the Czech Republic is a member

Economy of the Czech Republic
Czech Republic
Government agencies of the Czech Republic
Supreme audit institutions